"Living for Love" is a song by Madonna.

Living for Love may also refer to:
Living for Love, novel by Barbara McMahon
Living for Love, album by Koreana, or the title track
Livin' for Love: The Natalie Cole Story, an 2000 American film starring Natalie Cole
"Livin' for Love", a 2000 song by Natalie Cole